St. Lucie may refer to:
 St. Lucie County, Florida
 St. Lucie County, Florida (1844-1855)
 St. Lucie Inlet, Florida
 St. Lucie Mets, minor league baseball team
 St. Lucie Nuclear Power Plant, Florida
 St. Lucie River, Florida
 St. Lucie Village, Florida
 St. Lucie County, Florida, Florida county founded in 1905
 St. Lucie Village, Florida, Florida town

See also
Saint Lucy
Santa Lucia (disambiguation)